University of Oxford v Humphreys is a UK employment law case concerning transfers of undertakings, and the job security rights of employees. It is authority for the proposition that, if an employee objects to a proposed change, he or she can be in a good position to claim constructive dismissal.

Facts
Mr Humphreys worked as an examiner for the Oxford Delegacy, and was to become a new Associated Examining Board employee. That would adversely affect his working conditions. He previously had tenure, and could only be sacked for wilful misconduct. He objected before the transfer (see TUPER 2006 regulation 4(7), but more crucially regulation 4(9) and art 4(2)), and then alleged constructive dismissal. Oxford University responded that they were not  Humphreys' employers at the time of the transfer, because his claim of constructive dismissal effectively meant he had already resigned, and was thus no longer an "employee".

Judgment
Potter LJ held that to accept the University's argument would make a nonsense of the Directive. Instead, the judge declared that Mr Humphreys' objection was effective to establish a valid claim of constructive dismissal against the University. The judge observed:

See also

UK labour law

References

United Kingdom labour case law
Court of Appeal (England and Wales) cases
2000 in British law
2000 in case law
History of the University of Oxford